Minister of Public Safety and Solicitor General may refer to:

 The minister in charge of the Ministry of Public Safety and Solicitor General (British Columbia)
 The minister in charge of the Department of Justice and Public Safety (New Brunswick) from 2000 to 2016